The 2004 AMA National Speedway Championship Series was staged over three rounds, which were held at Auburn (August 6), Victorville (August 7) and Auburn (September 24). Greg Hancock won the title for a fifth time, and for the second time in succession.

Event format 
Over the course of 20 heats, each rider raced against every other rider once. The field was then split into sections of four riders, with the top four entering the 'A' Final. Points were then awarded depending on where a rider finished in each final. The points in the 'A' Final were awarded thus, 20, 18, 16 and 14. Bonus points for were also awarded.

Classification

References 

AMA
United States
Speed
Speed